The 2007 UCI BMX World Championships took place in Victoria, British Columbia in Canada and crowned world champions in the cycling discipline of BMX. Great Britain's Shanaze Reade built upon winning gold at the junior level last year and winning gold at the 2007 UCI Track Cycling World Championships by taking victory in the Elite Women category. In the elite men's event, Kyle Bennett won his third world championship.

Medals table

Medal summary

External links
Official event website
Union Cycliste Internationale website

UCI BMX World Championships
International sports competitions hosted by Canada
Uci Bmx World Championships
Uci Bmx World Championships, 2007
UCI BMX